The Supreme Court of the Maldives is the highest court of the Maldives.

Notable rulings

Four members of the country's Election Commission were set to spend six months in jail for 'disobeying orders'.

See also

Judiciary of the Maldives

References

External links

Supreme Court of the Maldives in the news

United Nations News Centre - Maldives: UN ‘deeply concerned’ as Supreme Court prosecutes rights advocates
Global Legal Monitor: Maldives: Supreme Court Decision on Freedom of Assembly and Expression | Global Legal Monitor | Law Library of Congress| Library of Congress

Other

The Maldivian Legal System - Husnu Al Suood - Google Books
Supreme Court of the Maldives website

Law of the Maldives
Maldives, Supreme Court of the
2000s establishments in the Maldives